Roosevelt Roberts (born February 11, 1994) is an American mixed martial artist (MMA) who competed in the Lightweight division in the Ultimate Fighting Championship (UFC).

Background
Roberts was born in Miami, Florida in 1994. After his mother left the family due to domestic violence, Roberts began living with friends and family members whenever they could take him in. Roberts began selling drugs and stealing to support himself. As a result, he ended up in a youth correctional facility in San Francisco, California for a year. Roberts started to turn his life around at 19 years old when his daughter was born and started training in MMA. He took his first amateur fight in 2014 and turned professional in 2016. Roberts trains at Adrenaline MMA in San Bernardino under head coach Adam Rothwieler and at Carlson Gracie Temecula under Brazilian jiu-jitsu coach Tom Cronin.

Mixed martial arts career

Early career and appearance on Dana White's Contender Series 
After a 6–1 amateur career, Roberts started his professional MMA career in 2016. He amassed a record of 5–0 prior to his appearance on Dana White's Contender Series 15 web-series program on July 21, 2018, where he faced Garrett Gross. He won the fight via a submission in the second round and was signed by UFC.

Ultimate Fighting Championship

Roberts made his UFC debut on November 20, 2018, against Darrell Horcher at The Ultimate Fighter 28 Finale. He won the fight via a guillotine choke in round one. This win earned the Performance of the Night  award.

His next fight came on April 27, 2019, against Thomas Gifford at UFC Fight Night: Jacaré vs. Hermansson. He won the fight via unanimous decision.

Roberts faced Vinc Pichel on June 29, 2019, at  UFC on ESPN 3. He lost the fight via unanimous decision.

Roberts faced Alexander Yakovlev on November 9, 2019, at UFC on ESPN+ 21.  He won the fight via unanimous decision.

Roberts was scheduled to face Matt Frevola on April 25, 2020. However, on April 9, promotional officials scrapped the pairing due to COVID-19 pandemic.

Roberts faced Brok Weaver on May 30, 2020, at UFC on ESPN: Woodley vs. Burns. At the weigh-ins, Weaver weighed in at 157.5 pounds, 1.5 pounds over the lightweight non-title fight limit of 156 pounds. He was fined 20 percent of his purse and the bout with Roberts proceeded at a catchweight. Roberts won the fight via submission in round two.

Roberts faced Jim Miller on June 20, 2020, at UFC Fight Night: Blaydes vs. Volkov. He lost the fight in the first round after verbally submitting to an armbar.

A bout with Matt Frevola was rescheduled and is expected to take place on September 12, 2020, at UFC Fight Night 177. On September 11, 2020, Frevola pulled out of the bout against Roberts, citing an injury. He was replaced by newcomer Kevin Croom. Roberts lost the fight via a guillotine choke in round one. On November 4, it was announced by the Nevada State Athletic Commission (NSAC) that the fight with Croom would be overturned to a no contest, after Croom tested positive for marijuana.

Roberts faced Ignacio Bahamondes on August 21, 2021, at UFC on ESPN 29. He lost the fight via knock out in round three.

On September 17, 2021, it was announced that Roberts was released by the UFC.

Post-UFC career
After being released from the UFC, Roberts faced Darren Smith Jr. for the vacant LXF Welterweight Championship at Lights Out Xtreme Fighting 7 on December 10, 2021. He claimed the title via first-minute knockout.

Roberts faced Alexandre de Almeida on May 20, 2022, at Eagle FC 47. At weigh ins, Alexandre Almeida missed weight for the bout. Alexandre Almeida weighed in at 158.4 pounds and was fined a percentage of his purse and the bout proceeded at catchweight. He won the fight via unanimous decision.

Personal life
Roosevelt has two children.

Championships and accomplishments
Ultimate Fighting Championship
Performance of the Night (One time) 
Lights Out Xtreme Fighting
LXF Welterweight Championship (one time)

Mixed martial arts record

|-
|Win
|align=center|12–3 (1)
|Alexandre de Almeida
|Decision (unanimous)
|Eagle FC 47
|
|align=center|3
|align=center|5:00
|Miami, Florida, United States
|
|-
|Win
|align=center|11–3 (1)
|Darren Smith Jr.
|KO (punch)
|LXF 7
|
|align=center|1
|align=center|0:32
|Commerce, California, United States
|
|-
|Loss
|align=center|10–3 (1)
|Ignacio Bahamondes
|KO (spinning wheel kick)
|UFC on ESPN: Cannonier vs. Gastelum 
|
|align=center|3
|align=center| 4:55
|Las Vegas, Nevada, United States
|
|-
|NC
|align=center|10–2 (1)
|Kevin Croom
|NC (overturned)
|UFC Fight Night: Waterson vs. Hill
|
|align=center|1
|align=center|0:31
|Las Vegas, Nevada, United States
|
|-
|Loss
|align=center|10–2
|Jim Miller
|Submission (armbar)
|UFC on ESPN: Blaydes vs. Volkov 
|
|align=center|1
|align=center|2:25
|Las Vegas, Nevada, United States
|
|-
|Win
|align=center|10–1
|Brok Weaver
|Submission (rear-naked choke)
|UFC on ESPN: Woodley vs. Burns
|
|align=center|2
|align=center|3:26
|Las Vegas, Nevada, United States
|
|-
|Win
|align=center|9–1
|Alexander Yakovlev
|Decision (unanimous)
|UFC Fight Night: Magomedsharipov vs. Kattar 
|
|align=center|3
|align=center|5:00
|Moscow, Russia
|
|-
|Loss
|align=center|8–1
|Vinc Pichel
|Decision (unanimous)
|UFC on ESPN: Ngannou vs. dos Santos 
|
|align=center|3
|align=center|5:00
|Minneapolis, Minnesota, United States
|
|-
|Win
|align=center|8–0
|Thomas Gifford
|Decision (unanimous)
|UFC Fight Night: Jacaré vs. Hermansson
|
|align=center|3
|align=center|5:00
|Sunrise, Florida, United States
|
|-
|Win
|align=center|7–0
|Darrell Horcher
|Submission (guillotine choke)
|The Ultimate Fighter: Heavy Hitters Finale
|
|align=center|1
|align=center|4:50
|Las Vegas, Nevada, United States
|
|-
|Win
|align=center|6–0
|Garrett Gross
|Submission (rear-naked choke)
|Dana White's Contender Series 15
|
|align=center|2
|align=center|2:13
|Las Vegas, Nevada, United States
|
|-
|Win
|align=center|5–0
|Tommy Aaron
|TKO (punches)
| Bellator 192
| 
|align=center|1
|align=center|N/A
|Inglewood, California, United States
|
|-
|Win
|align=center|4–0
|Shohei Yamamoto
|TKO (punches)
|CXF 9
|
|align=center|2
|align=center|1:47
|Studio City, California, United States
|
|-
|Win
|align=center|3–0
|Dominic Clark
|Submission (guillotine choke)
|CXF 8
|
|align=center|1
|align=center|1:47
|Burbank, California, United States
|
|-
|Win
|align=center|2–0
|Andrew Kauppila
|TKO (punches)
|KOTC: Groundbreaking
|
|align=center|1
|align=center|0:23
|San Jacinto, California, United States
|
|-
|Win
|align=center|1–0
|Michael Thomas
|Submission (guillotine choke)
|California Fight League 9
|
|align=center|1
|align=center|2:58
|Victorville, California, United States
|
|-

See also
List of male mixed martial artists

References

External links
 
 

1994 births
Lightweight mixed martial artists
Mixed martial artists utilizing Brazilian jiu-jitsu
Living people
American male mixed martial artists
American practitioners of Brazilian jiu-jitsu
Mixed martial artists from California
Ultimate Fighting Championship male fighters